John Baynes (1758–1787) was an English lawyer and miscellaneous writer.

Life
Baynes was born at Middleham, Yorkshire, and educated at Richmond Grammar School in the same county, under Anthony Temple. Proceeding to Trinity College, Cambridge, he graduated B.A. in 1777, gaining one of Dr. Smith's prizes for philosophy and the first medal for classics. In 1780 he took his M.A.

Baynes was admitted to Gray's Inn in 1778 or 1779, and read law with Alan Chambre. In 1779 he was elected a fellow of Trinity, and remained one till his death. Besides practising as a special pleader, Baynes turned his attention to politics, and like his tutor, John Jebb, became a zealous whig. He joined the Constitutional Society of London, and took an active part in the meeting at York in 1779. At the general election of 1784 he supported the nomination of William Wilberforce for Yorkshire, and inveighed against the late coalition of Portland and Lord North.

Shortly before his death Baynes, with the junior fellows of Trinity, memorialised the senior fellows and master on the irregular election of fellows, but they were only answered by a censure. The memorialists appealed to the lord chancellor as visitor of the college, and the censure was removed from the college books.

Baynes died in London from a putrid fever, on 3 August 1787, and was buried by the side of his friend Dr. Jebb in Bunhill Fields.

Works
Baynes contributed political articles to the London Courant. He wrote (anonymously) political verses and translations from French and Greek poems; some of these were published in the European Magazine (xii. 240). He is mentioned by Andrew Kippis as supplying materials for the Biographia Britannica. The archæological epistle to Jeremiah Milles, on the Rowley poems was ascribed to Baynes, because it passed through his hands to the press; but he denied the authorship. Cannon in the Oxford Dictionary of National Biography suggests William Mason used Baynes to have it published.

References

Attribution

1758 births
1787 deaths
18th-century English lawyers
18th-century English writers
18th-century English male writers
People from Middleham
Alumni of Trinity College, Cambridge
Members of Gray's Inn
Fellows of Trinity College, Cambridge
Burials at Bunhill Fields